Šabac (Serbian Cyrillic: Шабац) is a city and the administrative centre of the Mačva District in western Serbia. The traditional centre of the fertile Mačva region, Šabac is located on the right banks of the river Sava. , the city proper has population of 53,919, while its administrative area comprises 118,347 inhabitants.

Name
The name Šabac was first mentioned in Ragusan documents dating to 1454. The origin of the city's name is uncertain; it is possible its name comes from the name of the city's main river, the Sava. The city is known by a variety of different names: Zaslon in medieval Serbian,  Szabács in Hungarian, Böğürdelen in Turkish, and Schabatz in German.

History

Archaeological evidence attests to more permanent settlement in the area from the Neolithic. In the Middle Ages, a Slavic settlement named Zaslon existed at the current location of Šabac.  The settlement was part of the Serbian Despotate until it fell to the Ottoman Empire in 1459.

In 1470, the Ottomans built the first fortress in the town and named it Beyerdelen (Böğürdelen, meaning "side-striker"). In 1476 the Hungarian king Matthias Corvinus captured the fort; it remained under administration of the Kingdom of Hungary until 1521, when it was again captured by the Ottomans. Under Hungarian administration, the town was part of the Banate of Macsó, whereas under Ottoman administration it was firstly part of the Sanjak of Zvornik within the Province of Bosnia, and later part of the Sanjak of Smederevo. Šabac was the administrative centre of the nahiye of Šabac, a local Ottoman administrative unit. During the Ottoman period, Šabac was a typical oriental town with tiny streets, small shops and several mosques. The population was composed of both Muslims and Serbs, along with smaller numbers of Hungarians and Croats.

Until the 19th century, Šabac was mostly under Ottoman administration, but control of the town changed hands several times between the Ottoman Empire and the Habsburg monarchy during the Ottoman-Habsburg wars. The first period of Habsburg rule began in 1718, when Šabac was incorporated into the Habsburg Kingdom of Serbia. After the Treaty of Belgrade (1739), Šabac reverted to Ottoman control and, straddling the boundary between the two empires, it gained importance as a market town. A second period of Habsburg control of the area followed starting in 1789. The storming of the city was one of the early experiences of the renowned military leader Józef Poniatowski. Ottoman control over the area was restored a few years later.

Šabac became a site of importance in Serbian history in the First Serbian Uprising when, in 1806, Karađorđe led the Serbian insurgents into one of the first victories over the Ottoman army near the nearby village of Mišar. Until 1813, the town was part of Revolutionary Serbia. A brief period of restored Ottoman control followed, but after the Second Serbian Uprising in 1815, Šabac was included into the now-autonomous Principality of Serbia under the Obrenović dynasty. This first ruling family of modern Serbia left its mark on the town; knez Miloš Obrenović's brother, the enlightened Jevrem Obrenović, built a personal residence and helped modernise the town: the period from 1820 to 1850 saw the establishment of a hospital, a pharmacy, a Serbian grammar school, a gymnasium, a theatre, and a musical society.

The Ottoman army evacuated the fort of Šabac in 1867, marking the end of the Ottoman presence in the area. The first newspaper in the Kingdom of Serbia was printed in Šabac in 1883, and the town was also the first in Serbia where women started visiting kafanas (pubs) on Sunday afternoons, as was customary for men.

The town prospered until the First World War, when it was occupied and devastated by the Austro-Hungarian army and had its population halved (from cca. 14,000 to 7,000) on the orders of Kasimir von Lütgendorf, despite the fact that the Royal Serbian Army evacuated the town without resistance. Lütgendorf later ordered three of his own soldiers to be publicly executed by bayonet in the town square for drunkenly discharging their rifles despite orders from his superior Karl Tersztyánszky von Nádas to stop, leading to him being court-martialed and convicted for murder after the war in 1920. World War I is also remembered for the battle on nearby Cer mountain where the Serbian army under general Stepa Stepanović won an early victory against Austria-Hungary in August 1914, the first Allied victory in the war. After the war, Šabac was decorated with the French War Cross with Palm (1920), the Czechoslovak War Cross (1925), and the Order of the Karađorđe's Star with Swords (1934).

In 1918, the town became a part of the newly formed Kingdom of Serbs, Croats and Slovenes (later renamed to Yugoslavia). From 1918 to 1922, it was the administrative seat of Podrinje District, from 1922 to 1929 the administrative seat of Podrinje Oblast, and from 1929 to 1941 it was a part of the Drina Banovina. An early milestone in the Yugoslav era of the town's history was the opening of the Zorka chemical plant in 1938. The city's renewal was interrupted by World War II and occupation by German troops (from 1941 to 1944). During the Axis occupation of Yugoslavia, Šabac was part of the area governed by the Military Administration in Serbia. Its population of 1,200 Jews were arrested and ended in the ill-fated Kladovo transport. During the Uprising in Serbia the united rebel forces of the Yugoslav Army in the Fatherland, forces of the Communist Party of Yugoslavia and Pećanac Chetniks attacked German garrison in Šabac in an event known as Attack on Šabac, but failed to capture the town. In the German and Croatian Ustaše retributions 1,130 civilians were executed, 21,500 imprisoned and most of the populated places in Mačva were completely burned down. Eventually, 7,000 inmates were killed.  The city was liberated from occupation by the Yugoslav Partisans in 1944. After the war, it was included into People's Republic of Serbia within the new socialist Yugoslavia. Since then, it grew into a modern industrial city with the aforementioned Zorka chemical plant and an expanded population. The 1970s saw the construction of the first modern sports hall. The swamp at the city's outskirts, Benska Bara, was drained and turned into a residential neighborhood, and a new bridge was built over the Sava river. By 2010, the population of the city and its suburbs had risen to 75,000.

Demographics

According to the 2011 census results, the city of Šabac has a population of 115,884 inhabitants.

Ethnic groups
The ethnic composition of the city of Šabac:

Local communities

Urban local communities

Rural local communities

Economy
Prior to 1990, Šabac had one of the best developed economies among cities in Yugoslavia. However, international sanctions against Yugoslavia during the Bosnian War provoked the shutdown of the Zorka plant, which was the main enterprise in Šabac. Many other major local firms like "Šapčanka", "Izgradnja", and "Nama" also shut down during this period.

The main industries of Šabac today are agriculture, transportation and food production. Since 2000, some of the more important companies are diary plant Mlekara Šabac, Elixir Group, Zorka Pharma, and Hesteel Serbia Iron & Steel - Tin mill. Production of raspberry is also highly developed in Šabac area. As of September 2017, Šabac has one of 14 free economic zones established in Serbia.

The following table gives a preview of total number of registered people employed in legal entities per their core activity (as of 2019):

Sports
There are several sports societies in Šabac:
 FK Mačva Šabac
 RK Metaloplastika
 VK Šabac
 Basketball club Šabac
 Boxing club Šabac
 Female handball club Medicinar
 Kayak club "Zorka color" Šabac
 Wrestling club Knight Šabac

Local media

Education

Elementary schools
 OŠ "Sele Jovanović"
 OŠ "Nikolaj Velimirović"
 OŠ "Vuk Karadzić"
 OŠ "Stojan Novaković"
 OŠ "Nata Jeličić"
 OŠ "Janko Veselinović"
 OŠ "Laza Lazarević"

High schools
Šabačka gimnazija (Šabac Grammar School)
High agriculture school
High medicine school "Dr Andra Jovanović"
High economical-commercial school
High chemical and textile school
High technical school
High music school Mihailo Vukdragović
High art school

Private centres of education
 King's College
 Premier
 Pygmalion
 Interlink

Transportation

Roads
The length and status of roads in the city are:
 Main roads  (all asphalt)
 Regional roads  (all asphalt)
 Local roads  ( asphalt)
 Unconventional roads  (only  asphalt)
 City streets 
22 km. highway from Šabac to Ruma is currently under construction and travelling from Belgrade to Sabac will take less than 40 minutes once it is completed.

Railway

Šabac railway station is served by a Serbian Railways' branch line connecting to the main Croatia to Belgrade railway at Ruma. A former line continued from the station to connect Serbia with Bosnia and Herzegovina. A branch which connected this line with Bogatić (Petlovača - Bogatić) is locked out. The railway is used for the transport of goods and raw materials for the Zorka factory and passenger transport to Ruma.

Politics
Seats in the city council won in the 2004 local elections: 

Democratic Party - Serbian Renewal Movement (25)
Serbian Radical Party (13)
Democratic Party of Serbia (11)
Socialist Party of Serbia (8)
Strength of Serbia Movement (6)
G17 Plus (4)
People's Peasant Party (2)
Group of the citizens "The voice of the people" (2)

Non-government organizations in Šabac
According to unofficial data, in the city of Šabac, there are over 300 registered non-government organizations, with wide variety of activities and different primary goals. Traditionally, the most active are those organizations whose primary goals are humanitarian, protection of the rights of persons with disabilities, protection of the rights of ethnic minorities,  protection of the vulnerable social categories, ecology, etc.

Beside traditionally active organizations in Šabac, there are non-government organizations which unites young people in purpose of protecting their own rights. Under the social category of youth (young people) are those who are not older than 30, and not younger than 15 years, according to Ministry (Department) of youth and sports, of the Republic of Serbia.

Some of the most active organizations in Šabac are: Youth Umbrella (Omladinski Kišobran), Caritas - Šabac, Roma for Roma, Human heart of Šabac (Humano srce Šapca), NGO Light, NGO Ecos.

Notable people

 Branimir Ćosić, writer and journalist
 Branislav Lečić, actor
 Draga Ljočić, the first female doctor in Serbia
 Dragiša Lapčević, politician, journalist, historian
 Dušan Ninić, novelist
 Isidora Sekulić, writer
 Janko Veselinović, writer
 Jela Spiridonović-Savić, poet
 Jevrem Obrenović, younger brother of Prince Miloš Obrenović, governor of the Šabac nahija (district)
 Jovan Cvijić, geographer, president of the Serbian Royal Academy, rector of the Belgrade University
 Józef Poniatowski, Polish leader, general
 Sava Petrović, botanist
 Kosta Abrašević, poet
 Laza Lazarević, doctor, writer
 Ljubiša Jovanović, actor
 Mileva Marić, Serbian physicist
 Milić Stanković, painter
 Milorad Popović Šapčanin, poet, writer, dramatist, pedagogue and educational reformer
 Sasha Knezev, Serbian American filmmaker and author
 Slobodan Jovanović, historian, lawyer, literary critic and politician
 Stanislav Vinaver, avant-garde writer
 Stojan Novaković, historian, scholar, writer, literary critic, translator, politician and diplomat
 Šaban Šaulić, folk singer
 Veselin Vujović, handball player
 Vladimir Jovanović, philosopher, political theorist, economist, politician, political writer
 Vladislav Lalicki, production designer, costume designer, painter
 Živojin Pavlović, film director, writer
 Lyenko Urbanchich (1922–2006), Australian politician
 Jasmina Vujic, nuclear engineering professor at Berkeley, 1st female nuclear engineering department chair in the US
 Aleksandar Živojinović, guitarist of Canadian rock band Rush born to ethnic Serbian parents from Šabac

Sportspeople:
 Mile Isaković, handballer
 Milutin Dragićević, handballer
 Miroslav Đukić, footballer
 Nemanja Matić, footballer
 Aleksandar Živojinović, Canadian musician and guitarist of the band RusH

Coat of arms of Šabac and armorial flag
There are three versions of the coat of arms of Šabac: the Primary, Middle, and Large.

Twin towns - sister cities
Šabac is twinned with:
 Argostoli, Greece
 Fujimi, Japan
 Kiryat Ata, Israel
 Kralupy nad Vltavou, Czech Republic

References

Footnotes

External links 
 

 
Populated places in Mačva District
Mačva
Municipalities and cities of Šumadija and Western Serbia
Recipients of the Czechoslovak War Cross